Stelian Moculescu (born 6 May 1950, in Brașov) is a Romanian volleyball coach and former player. From 1987 to 1990 and from 1999 to 2008 he was also the coach of the Germany men's national volleyball team and the Romania men's national volleyball team. He is widely considered one of the greatest coaches in the history of this sport and a living legend.

He was awarded the Volleyball-Award in 2007 by the German Volleyball Association for his services to the sport.

Honours
CEV Champions League:
 Winner (1): 2006-07
 Runner-up (2): 1995–96, 1999–2000
 Third (1): 1998-99
German League:
 Winner (20): 1975, 1978, 1980, 1991, 1995, 1996, 1998, 1999, 2000, 2001, 2002, 2005, 2006, 2007, 2008, 2009, 2010, 2011, 2015, 2018
German Cup:
 Winner (21):  1973, 1975, 1978, 1979, 1980, 1982, 1990, 1997, 1998, 1999, 2001, 2002, 2003, 2004, 2005, 2006, 2007, 2008, 2012, 2014, 2015
Austrian League:
 Winner (3): 1981, 1984, 1985
Austrian Cup:
 Winner (2): 1983, 1984

Awards and recognition 
 CEV Coach of the Year (2007)
 Order of Merit of Baden-Württemberg (2008)

References

External links 
Profile of Stelian Moculescu at vfb-volleyball.de
Profile at sports-reference.com

1950 births
Living people
Romanian men's volleyball players
Olympic volleyball players of Romania
Volleyball players at the 1972 Summer Olympics
Romanian volleyball coaches
Volleyball coaches of international teams
Romanian expatriate sportspeople in Germany
Romanian expatriate sportspeople in Austria
Sportspeople from Brașov
Recipients of the Order of Merit of Baden-Württemberg